Nicholas Murray (December 25, 1802 – February 4, 1861) was Moderator of the General Assembly of the Presbyterian Church in the United States of America.

Biography
Murray was born in Ballinasloe, County Galway, Ireland on December 25, 1802. In 1818, he emigrated to the United States, becoming an apprentice printer with Harper Brothers. Later in life, he graduated from Williams College in 1826, he was ordained a minister, and became Moderator of the Presbyterian General Assembly of America.

Murray wrote extensively of his travels and on archaeology, which was an abiding interest. An occasional pseudonym was Kirwan. He died and was buried in Elizabeth, New Jersey in 1861.

Select bibliography
 Letters to the Rt. Rev. J. Hughes, Roman Catholic Bishop of New York, by Kirwan. 2nd series, 1848
 Kirwan's letter to Dr. Cote, on Baptism, with Dr. Cote's reply, 1849
 the Decline of Popery and its causes. An address, etc,, New York, 1851
 Romanism at home, being letters to the Hon. Roger B. Taney, 1852
 American Principles on National Prosperity. A thanksgiving Sermon (on Ps. CXVIII.25), etc.''', 1854
 Kirwan (i.e., N. Murray) on Bedini and Dr. Duff. An address, etc, 1854

References

 Galway Authors'', Helen Mahar, 1976

External links

People from Ballinasloe
Irish emigrants to the United States (before 1923)
1802 births
1861 deaths
Irish Presbyterians
19th-century travel writers
Irish travel writers
Irish archaeologists
Williams College alumni
Presbyterian Church in the United States of America ministers
19th-century Presbyterian ministers
19th-century American clergy